Nostalgiya is a Russian television channel, catering to nostalgia for the Soviet Union. Launched in 2004, the channel broadcasts to almost all the European portion of the former Soviet Union 

The logo of the channel is stylized with a combination of Cyrillic letters  and  that looks like the hammer and sickle (☭) turned in the opposite direction to the right.

One of its main presentations is a talk show "Born in the USSR" (Rozhdyonnye v SSSR) which provides a daily interactive discussion with its spectators.

References

External links
 Official website
 Born in the USSR *Рожденные в СССР*

Television channels and stations established in 2004
Russian-language television stations
Classic television networks
Television channels in Russia
Russian brands
Communism in Russia
Dissolution of the Soviet Union
Russian nationalism
Nostalgia for the Soviet Union